Xiaoyan or Hsiao-yen or  is a Chinese-language feminine given name. It may refer to:

Cheng Xiaoyan (born 1975), Chinese shot putter
Gao Xiaoyan (born 1957), Chinese army major general
Liao Xiaoyan (born 1987), Chinese hammer thrower
Pai Hsiao-yen (1980–1997), Taiwanese murder victim
Wang Xiaoyan (born 1970), Chinese Olympic softball player
Yang Xiaoyan (born 1930), Chinese name of bridge player Katherine Wei-Sender
Yang Xiaoyan (born 1980), Chinese Olympic sailor
Zhou Xiaoyan (1917–2016), Chinese opera singer
Zhuang Xiaoyan  (born 1969), Chinese judoka and Olympic champion

See also
Xiaoyan, Anhua, a town in Hunan Province
Yang Xiaoyan (disambiguation)

Chinese feminine given names